Pico do Vento is a mountain in the eastern part of the island of São Vicente. It is situated south of the Ribeira do Calhau valley, 12 km southeast of the island capital Mindelo.

See also
 List of mountains in Cape Verde

External links
 Pico do Vento on mindelo.info 

Vento
Vento